Miss Mabel is a 1948 stage play by R. C. Sherriff. It has been adapted for television at least five times.

1950 version
A live version aired as part of British anthology series BBC Sunday Night Theatre in 1950. Cast included Mary Jerrold, Clive Morton, Richard Warner, W. E. Holloway, Josephine Middleton, Herbert C. Walton, Anne West, Ronald Marriott, Rowland Winterton and Anthony Farmer. It was performed on 26 March 1950 with a repeat performance on 29 March 1950. Both performances are lost, as the live broadcasts were not recorded.

1953 version
A live version aired in 1953 as part of American anthology series Kraft Television Theatre on NBC. Cast included Lloyd Bochner, Malcolm Keen, Estelle Winwood and Frederick Worlock.

1956 version
A version aired in 1956 as part of American anthology series Lux Video Theatre on CBS. Cast included Irene Anders, Anthony Eustrel, Ruth Hammond, Terrence Kilburn, Elsa Lanchester, J. Pat O'Malley, Richard Peel, Roland Winters and Frederick Worlock.

1958 Australian TV Version

A version aired in 1958 on Australian television directed by Paul O'Loughlin. It broadcast live from Sydney on 23 April 1958 and was the television debut of Minnie Love, who was a noted stage entertainer.

Originally broadcast live in Sydney, kinescope ("telerecording") was made of the broadcast and later shown in Melbourne on 14 May. It went for 65 minutes. It is not known if the kinescope recording still exists.

Premise
An old lady has an unpleasant twin who recently died.

Cast
Minnie Love as Miss Mabel
Walter Pym as the lawyer
Charles Tasman as the vicar
Ida Newton as Miss Wilson
Geoffrey King as the doctor
John Bluthal as the Gardener
Lewis Fiander as Peter
Derani Scarr as Mary
Peter Owen as the Inspector.

Production
Love said she was enthusiastic about live television because it was so close to theatre.

Reception
The Age said Love gave "an outstanding performance" which "inspired the cast".

1980 version
A version aired in 1980 as part of French television series Au théâtre ce soir. Cast included Jandeline, Annick Alane, Vannick Le Poulain, Brigitte Winstel, Jean-Pierre Delage, Jacques Dynam, Robert Le Béal, Jean Barney, Bernard Lanneau, Edward Sanderson, and Bernard Durand.

References

See also
Black Limelight - Stage play which also saw multiple television adaptations
One Bright Day
List of live television plays broadcast on Australian Broadcasting Corporation (1950s)

1948 plays
1958 television plays
Australian television plays
Australian Broadcasting Corporation original programming
English-language television shows
Black-and-white American television shows
Black-and-white Australian television shows
Black-and-white British television shows
American live television series
French-language television shows
Lost BBC episodes
British live television shows
Australian live television shows